The 2010–11 Spanish football season is Sabadell's fourth consecutive season in Segunda División B, the third level in the Spanish football leagues system. Lluís Carreras is the club's new manager.

Trophies balance

Competitive Balance

Summer transfers

In

Out

Loan in

Loan out

Loan return

Winter transfers

Loan out

Current squad

Squad

Youth system

Nominated by their national football team

Match stats

League stats

RFEF League Trophy Goals 
1 goal
 Hiroshi Ibusuki
 Julián Robles
 Fito Miranda
 Aitor Ramírez
 Joaquín Rodríguez

Match results

Pre-season

Friendly matches

25th Torneig d'Històrics del Futbol Català
Note: All the matches have 45 minutes duration.

2010 Vila de Llagostera Trophy

2010–11 Copa Catalunya

2010 Ciutat de Igualada Trophy

Segunda División B

 Win   Draw   Lost

 League Group Winners (qualified to Group Winners promotion play-off and to 2011–12 Copa del Rey 1st round)
 Qualified to Non-champions promotion play-off (also qualified to 2011–12 Copa del Rey 1st round)
 Only qualified to 2011–12 Copa del Rey
 Qualified to relegation play-off
 Relegation to Tercera División

Promotion play-off

Group Winners play-off

Semifinals 
Qualified as Group 3 champions. The draw was in RFEF headquarters, in Las Rozas (Madrid), on Monday 16 May 2011, at 16:30 CEST.

CE Sabadell 1–1 SD Eibar on aggregate. CE Sabadell won on away goals. CE Sabadell promoted to Liga Adelante 19 years later.

Final 

CE Sabadell 1–1 Real Murcia on aggregate. Real Murcia became Segunda División B champions by winning 9–8 at the penalty shootout.

RFEF League Trophy

Autonomous Communities Qualifying Stage (Catalonia)

CE Sabadell won 1–0 on aggregate.

Round of 32

Atlético Baleares 1–1 CE Sabadell on aggregate. CE Sabadell won on away goals.

Round of 16

CE Sabadell 3–3 Real Zaragoza B on aggregate. Real Zaragoza B won on away goals.

References

2010-11
Spanish football clubs 2010–11 season
2010–11 in Catalan football